Dahich (also Romanized as Dahīch) is a village in Dar Pahn Rural District, Senderk District, Minab County, Hormozgan Province, Iran. At the 2006 census, its population was 354, within 88 families.

References 

Populated places in Minab County